"Communication Theory of Secrecy Systems" is a paper published in 1949 by Claude Shannon discussing cryptography from the viewpoint of information theory. It is one of the foundational treatments (arguably the foundational treatment) of modern cryptography. It is also a proof that all theoretically unbreakable ciphers must have the same requirements as the one-time pad.

Shannon published an earlier version of this research in the formerly classified report A Mathematical Theory of Cryptography, Memorandum MM 45-110-02, Sept. 1, 1945, Bell Laboratories. This report also precedes the publication of his "A Mathematical Theory of Communication", which appeared in 1948.

See also
 Confusion and diffusion
 Product cipher
 One-time pad
 Unicity distance

References
 Shannon, Claude. "Communication Theory of Secrecy Systems", Bell System Technical Journal, vol. 28(4), page 656–715, 1949.
 Shannon, Claude. "A Mathematical Theory of Cryptography", Memorandum MM 45-110-02, Sept. 1, 1945, Bell Laboratories.

Notes

https://www.itsoc.org/about/shannon

External links
 Online retyped copy of the paper 
 Scanned version of the published BSTJ paper

History of cryptography
Cryptography publications
1945 in science
1949 documents
1949 in science
1945 documents
Mathematics papers